Paeoniflorin is a chemical compound which is one of the major constituents of an herbal medicine derived from Paeonia lactiflora. It can also be isolated from the fresh water fern Salvinia molesta.

In Paeonia, it can form new compounds with addition of phenolic substituents. In a study in female rats, paeoniflorin was found to inhibit the production of testosterone within the ovaries, however does not significantly affect the production of Estradiol.
In mice, paeoniflorin was shown to protect against neuroinflammation and depression-like behavior induced by IFN alpha.

References 

Glucosides
Benzoate esters